Lithuania competed at the 2017 World Championships in Athletics in London, United Kingdom, from 4 to 13 August 2017.

Medalists 
The following competitor from Lithuania won medals at the Championships:

Results 
(q – qualified, NM – no mark, SB – season best)

Men 
Track and road events

Field events

Women 
Track and road events

Field events

Sources 
Lithuanian team

Nations at the 2017 World Championships in Athletics
World Championships in Athletics
Lithuania at the World Championships in Athletics